La Ceiba is one of the 20 municipalities of the state of Trujillo, Venezuela. The municipality occupies an area of 386 km2 with a population of 26,301 inhabitants according to the 2011 census.

Parishes
The municipality consists of the following four parishes:

 El Progreso
 La Ceiba
 Santa Apolonia
 Tres de Febrero

References

Municipalities of Trujillo (state)